Rollulinae is a bird subfamily containing the jungle and wood partridges. They are the most basal member of the family Phasianidae, having diverged during the late Eocene or early Oligocene, about 30-35 million years ago. Many taxonomists formerly placed this subfamily within the Perdicinae, but more recent studies have affirmed its existence, and it is accepted by taxonomic authorities such as the International Ornithological Congress.

Members of this family are mostly found in east and southeast Asia, along with a single basal genus containing two species endemic to two mountain ranges in Tanzania.

Species in taxonomic order 
This list is ordered to show presumed relationships between species.

References

Rollulinae
Bird subfamilies
Taxa named by Charles Lucien Bonaparte